Virginia Law Weekly is a weekly newspaper published by students at the University of Virginia School of Law each Wednesday of the school year, excluding breaks and exam periods. In 2006, 2007, 2008, 2017, 2018, and 2019, the Law Weekly was recognized as Best Law School Newspaper by the Law Student Division of the American Bar Association.  

Virginia Law Weekly was first printed in 1948 and has been cited by several courts in published judicial opinions, including the U.S. Supreme Court (Patterson v. New York (1977)), the Fifth Circuit (Thermo King v. White's Trucking Service, 292 F.2d 668 (5th Cir. 1961)), and numerous state courts.

Virginia Law Weekly was first published online in the late 1990s, providing a downloadable PDF version of each week's edition. Features Editor Joey Katzen '07 relaunched the website as a full-featured interactive newspaper site in the spring of 2005. Technology Editor David Markoff '17 redesigned the website in 2016.

References

External links
Virginia Law Weekly website

Legal education in the United States
University of Virginia
Student newspapers published in Virginia
1948 establishments in Virginia
Publications established in 1948
Weekly newspapers published in the United States